Rais-de-cœur (also known as leaf-and-dart and heart-and-dart)  is an ornamental motif made up of heart-shaped leaves (or waterleaves inside hearts) alternating with spearheads (or darts). This motif was used in Ancient Greek and Roman architecture. It was taken up again during the Renaissance, abundantly in the 18th century, being used in the Louis XVI style. 

The French word literally means "rays (beams of light) from heart[s]" (its Italian equivalent being ), as the "darts" can resemble triangular lightrays emerging from between the hearts.
The singular equivalent is rarely used.

See also 
 Egg-and-dart, a similar motif

Notes

External links

Ornaments (architecture)
Visual motifs